Orre may refer to:

People
Eystein Orre (died 1066), a Norwegian noble who was killed at the Battle of Stamford Bridge
Magne Orre (born 1950), a Norwegian cyclist

Places
Orre, Rogaland, a village in Klepp municipality, Rogaland county, Norway
Old Orre Church, a church in the village of Orre in Klepp municipality, Rogaland county, Norway
Orre Church, a church in the village of Pollestad in Klepp municipality, Rogaland county, Norway

Other
 Orre region, the setting of Pokémon Colosseum and its sequel, Pokémon XD: Gale of Darkness